Nicolaes Lachtropius (1640, Amsterdam – 1700, Alphen aan den Rijn), was a Dutch Golden Age flower painter.

Biography
According to the RKD he was a flower still life painter who followed Otto Marseus van Schrieck. He worked in Amsterdam, The Hague and in Leiden and was last registered in Alphen aan den Rijn.

References

Nicolaes Lachtropius on Artnet

1640 births
1700 deaths
Dutch Golden Age painters
Dutch male painters
Painters from Amsterdam
Flower artists
Dutch still life painters